Punta Cometa is a peninsula on the Pacific Coast of Mexico.

Geography
It extends into the Pacific Ocean within Mazunte municipality of Oaxaca state, in western Mexico.

It is the southernmost point in the state of Oaxaca.

See also

References

Peninsulas of Mexico
Landforms of Oaxaca
Pacific Coast of Mexico